Mykyta (Nikita) Kryvonos (born September 1, 1986) is an American former professional tennis player.

Born in Ukraine, Kryvonos moved with his family from Donetsk to New York City at the age of 13.

Kryvonos reached a career best singles world ranking of 389 and won four ITF Futures titles. He was used as a practice partner on the United States Davis Cup team in 2006. While competing on the ATP Challenger Tour he had a win over top 100 player Frank Dancevic. In doubles his best ranking was 508 and he played in the main draw of the 2005 US Open as a wildcard pairing with Denis Zivkovic, losing in the first round to José Acasuso and Sebastián Prieto.

In 2017 he was handed a 10-year ban and $20,000 fine by the Tennis Integrity Unit for anti-corruption breaches. He was found guilty of colluding with third parties "to contrive the outcome of a match" at a 2015 Challenger tournament.

ITF Futures titles

Singles: (4)

Doubles: (6)

References

External links
 
 

1986 births
Living people
American male tennis players
Ukrainian emigrants to the United States
Sportspeople from Donetsk
Match fixing in tennis
Sportspeople involved in betting scandals